Varan a fictional monster from the 1958 Japanese film Varan the Unbelievable.

Varan may also refer to:

Varan, Iran, village in Iran
Esin Varan, American actress  
 VARAN, an industrial communication system
Varanus, a genus of lizards
Ateliers Varan, association of filmmakers based in Paris, named after the lizard

See also
Varan-TV, Swedish TV-series